Naphrys pulex is a species of spider from the family Salticidae that is widely distributed in Canada and the United States.

Description
Males have gray and black mottling on the top of their cephalothorax, abdomen, and legs, with orange coloration around the sides of the cephalothorax.

Habitat
The species can be found in tall grass prairies and wooded areas. It is very common in mesic hardwood forests, where there is plenty of leaf litter. Finding this species in buildings, on bark or outcrops is also likely. The species feed on insects and other arthropods.

References

External links
 

Salticidae
Spiders of North America
Spiders described in 1846